The 1860 United States presidential election in Connecticut took place on November 2, 1860, as part of the 1860 United States presidential election. Voters chose six electors of the Electoral College, who voted for president and vice president.

Connecticut was won by Republican candidate Abraham Lincoln, who won by a margin of 32.36%.

Results

See also
 United States presidential elections in Connecticut

References

1860 Connecticut elections
1860
Connecticut